Stokke AS is a Norwegian manufacturer of children's furniture and accessories, founded by Georg Stokke in 1932. Stokke is known for producing the Tripp Trapp adjustable high chair, the best-selling item of furniture in Norway, developed by the Norwegian furniture designer Peter Opsvik
and launched in 1972.

In cooperation with Hans Christian Mengshoel, Peter Opsvik also designed the original Balans kneeling chair, produced by Stokke, launched in 1979.

In the 1980s Stokke produced the iconic 'Ekstrem' lounge chair, designed by Terje Ekström in 1972.

The part of the company that manufactures ergonomic office chairs is now a separate entity called Varier Furniture.

In December 2013 it was announced that the NXMH, the investment arm of the Korean game maker Nexon, was to buy the company from the Stokke family.

References

External links 
 

Furniture companies of Norway